Jinmu may refer to:

Emperor Jimmu, legendary first Emperor of Japan
Queen Mother of the West, Chinese deity, also known as Jinmu (Golden Mother)
Jinmu Cape, southernmost tip of Hainan Island, China